The 1966 United States Senate election in West Virginia was held on November 8, 1966. Incumbent Democratic U.S. Senator Jennings Randolph won re-election to a third term.

Primary elections 
Primary elections were held on May 10, 1966.

Democratic primary

Candidate 
 Jennings Randolph, incumbent U.S. Senator

Results

Republican primary

Candidate 
 Harold G. Cutright, business consultant and unsuccessful candidate for Democratic nomination for Governor in 1964
 Francis J. Love, former U.S. Congressman

Results

General election

Result

See also 
 1966 United States Senate elections

References

Bibliography 
 
 

West Virginia
1966
United States Senate